Charlotte Wolter (March 1, 1834June 14, 1897), Austrian actress, was born at Cologne, and began her artistic career at Budapest in 1857.

Biography

She played minor parts at the theatre in Vienna, and soon obtained an engagement at the Victoria theatre in Berlin, where she remained until 1861. Her performance of Hermione in the Winter's Tale took the play-going world by storm, and she was given in 1862 an appointment at the Vienna Hofburg theatre, to which she remained faithful until her death. According to her wish, she was buried in the costume of Iphigenia, in which role she had achieved her most brilliant success.

Evaluation

Charlotte Wolter was one of the great tragic actresses of the Victorian age. Her repertory included Medea, Sappho, Lady Macbeth, Mary Stuart, Preciosa, Phèdre, Adrienne Lecouvreur, Jane Eyre and Messalina, in which character she was immortalized by the painter Hans Makart. She was also an inimitable exponent of the heroines in plays by Grillparzer, Hebbel, Dumas and Sardou.

Notes

References
Attribution:
 Endnotes:
 Ehrenfeld, Charlotte Wolter (Vienna, 1887)
 Hirschfeld, Charlotte Wolter, ein Erinnerungsblatt (1897).

External link

1834 births
1897 deaths
Austrian stage actresses
19th-century Austrian actresses
Actors from Cologne